Kreis Czarnikau was one of many Kreise (counties) in Regierungsbezirk Bromberg, in the Prussian Province of Posen. It existed from 1816 to 1920 and had its capital at Czarnikau. Today, the area of this district belongs to Poland and is part of the Greater Poland Voivodeship.

History
The district area became part of Prussia after the First Partition of Poland in 1772. The district of Czarnikau was formed on July 1, 1816. On January 1, 1818, the new district of Chodziesen (later renamed Kolmar in Posen) was formed from the eastern part of the Czarnikau district. On October 1, 1887, the new Filehne district was formed from the western part of the Czarnikau district.

By the Treaty of Versailles, the district was divided on January 10, 1920. The area south of the Netze river became part of Poland. The area north of the Netze remained in Germany and became part of the Netzekreis in the new province of Grenzmark Posen-West Prussia.

Demographics 

The Czarnikau district had a German majority population and a large Polish minority.

Table of Standesämter 
"Standesamt" is the German name of the local civil registration offices which were established in October 1874 soon after the German Empire was formed. Births, marriages and deaths were recorded. Previously, only the church records were used for Christians.

References 

This article is part of the project Wikipedia:WikiProject Prussian Kreise. Please refer to the project page, before making changes.

Districts of the Province of Posen